Nationalist Party of Peru may refer to:

 Nationalist Party of Peru (Eguiguren), a political party in Peru, founded by Luis Antonio Eguiguren
 Nationalist Party of Peru (Revilla), a political party in Peru, founded by Clemente Revilla
 Peruvian Nationalist Party